The 7th Macau International Movie Festival ceremony, organized by the Macau Film and Television Media Association and China International Cultural Communication Center, honored the best films of 2015 in the Greater China Region and took place on 13 December 2015, in Macau.

Wolf Totem was the biggest winner, receiving three awards, including Best Picture, Best Director, and Best Cinematography.

Winners and nominees

Extra Awards
Best Animated Feature Film (最佳动画片奖)
Outstanding Motion Picture Production Award (优秀动物电影制作奖) 
Best Film Producer (最佳电影制片人)
Chinese Film Outstanding Contribution Award (中国电影杰出贡献奖)
Chinese Performing Arts Outstanding Achievement Award (华语表演艺术杰出成就奖)

References

External links

Golden Lotus Awards
Macau
2015 in Macau
Gold